Richard Tylden Auchmuty (July 15, 1831 – July 18, 1893) was an officer in the American Civil War, an architect, and philanthropist. His works were built in New York City and Massachusetts. He designed St. Mary's Episcopal Church at 230 Classon Avenue in Brooklyn and Trinity Episcopal Church at 102 Walker Street in Lenox, Massachusetts, both of which are listed on the National Register of Historic Places. His grandfather signed the Declaration of Independence. He worked for and then in partnership with James Renwick.

He served in the Fifth Corps and climbed in rank to retire a Lieutenant Colonel. According to a letter he wrote he served at Gettysburg.

Auchmuty was born in New York City, the only son of a prominent family. He was philanthropic.

A volume of his Civil War letters was published privately.

Auchmuty died of pulmonary edema at home in Lenox, Massachusetts, on July 18, 1893. His leg was buried first and then he followed several months after at Green-Wood Cemetery.

Work
The Dormers, his home, in Lenox
St. Mary's Episcopal Church (Brooklyn)
Trinity Episcopal Church (Lenox, Massachusetts)

Further reading
Herringshaw's National Library of American Biography, 1909

References

19th-century American architects
1831 births
1893 deaths
Military personnel from New York City
Union Army soldiers
Philanthropists from New York (state)
Architects from New York City
Architects from Massachusetts
People from Lenox, Massachusetts
Burials at Green-Wood Cemetery
19th-century American philanthropists